Vriesea is a genus of flowering plants in the botanical family Bromeliaceae, subfamily
Tillandsioideae. The genus name is for Willem Hendrik de Vriese, Dutch botanist, physician (1806–1862). Its species are widespread over Mexico, Central America, South America and the West Indies.

Containing some of the largest bromeliad species, these tropical plants harbor a wide variety of insect fauna, unlike the smaller Catopsis species. In the wild, frogs may go through their whole life cycle in a bromeliad. This genus is closely related to Guzmania. Both Guzmania and Vriesea have dry capsules that split open to release parachute like seeds similar to the Dandelion (Taraxacum sp.). Most Vriesea are epiphytes and grow soil-less on trees. they have no roots but have special hold fasts that do not take in any nutrients. All nutrients are taken in through the center "tank" made by a rosette of leaves.

Species
, Plants of the World Online accepted the following species:

Vriesea agostiniana E.Pereira – Rio de Janeiro
Vriesea alta (Baker) É.Morren ex Mez – Panama
Vriesea altimontana E.Pereira & Martinelli – Rio de Janeiro
Vriesea altodaserrae L.B.Sm. – from Rio de Janeiro to Santa Catarina
Vriesea altomacaensis A.Costa – Rio de Janeiro
Vriesea altomayoensis H.Luther & K.F.Norton – Peru
Vriesea amethystina É.Morren – Espírito Santo + Rio de Janeiro
Vriesea andaraiensis Leme – Bahia
Vriesea andreettae Rauh – Azuay Province of Ecuador
Vriesea appendiculata (L.B.Sm.) L.B.Sm. – Loja Province of Ecuador
Vriesea arachnoidea A.Costa – Minas Gerais, Rio de Janeiro
Vriesea arpocalyx (André) L.B.Sm. – Ecuador
Vriesea atra Mez – from Bahia to Santa Catarina
Vriesea atrococcinea Rauh – Rio de Janeiro
Vriesea atropurpurea Silveira – Minas Gerais
Vriesea aureoramosa F.P.Uribbe & A.F.Costa
Vriesea bahiana Leme – Bahia
Vriesea barbosae J.A.Siqueira & Leme – Pernambuco
Vriesea barilletii É.Morren – Espírito Santo
Vriesea baturitensis Versieux & Tomaz
Vriesea biguassuensis Reitz – Santa Catarina in southern Brazil
Vriesea billbergioides É.Morren ex Mez – São Paulo, Minas Gerais, Rio de Janeiro
Vriesea bituminosa Wawra – Venezuela, eastern Brazil
Vriesea blackburniana Leme – Bahia
Vriesea bleheri Roeth & W.Weber – Rio de Janeiro
Vriesea boeghii H.Luther – Loja Province of Ecuador
Vriesea breviscapa (E.Pereira & I.A.Penna) Leme – Bahia, Espírito Santo
Vriesea × brueggemannii J.Z.Matos, M.B.Crespo & Juan
Vriesea brusquensis Reitz – from São Paulo to Santa Catarina
Vriesea cacuminis L.B.Sm. – Minas Gerais
Vriesea calimaniana Leme & W.Till – Espírito Santo
Vriesea capixabae Leme – Espírito Santo
Vriesea carinata Wawra – eastern + southern Brazil
Vriesea carmeniae R.L.Moura & A.F.Costa
Vriesea castaneobulbosa (Mez & Wercklé) J.R.Grant – Costa Rica
Vriesea cathcartii H.Luther – Ecuador
Vriesea cearensis L.B.Sm. – Ceará
Vriesea cereicola (Mez) L.B.Sm. – Peru
Vriesea chapadensis Leme – Bahia
Vriesea cipoensis O.B.C.Ribeiro, C.C.Paula & Guarçoni – Minas Gerais
Vriesea claudiana Leme, Trind.-Lima & O.B.C.Ribeiro – Minas Gerais
Vriesea clausseniana (Baker) Mez – Minas Gerais
Vriesea colnagoi E.Pereira & I.A.Penna – Espírito Santo
Vriesea confusa L.B.Sm. – Nariño region of Colombia
Vriesea corcovadensis (Britton) Mez – from Bahia to Santa Catarina
Vriesea correia-arauji E.Pereira & I.A.Penna
Vriesea crassa Mez – Minas Gerais, Rio de Janeiro
Vriesea curvispica Rauh – Peru
Vriesea cylindrica L.B.Sm. – Peru, Ecuador, Colombia
Vriesea debilis Leme – Espírito Santo
Vriesea declinata Leme – Santa Catarina in southern Brazil
Vriesea delicatula L.B.Sm. – Espírito Santo
Vriesea densiflora Mez – Minas Gerais
Vriesea diamantinensis Leme – Minas Gerais
Vriesea dictyographa Leme – Bahia
Vriesea dissitiflora (C.Wright) Mez – Cuba
Vriesea drepanocarpa (Baker) Mez – from Bahia to Santa Catarina
Vriesea drewii L.B.Sm. – Ecuador
Vriesea dubia (L.B.Sm.) L.B.Sm. – Colombia, Peru, Ecuador
Vriesea duidae (L.B.Sm.) Gouda – Guyana, Venezuela
Vriesea duvaliana É.Morren – Bahia
Vriesea elata (Baker) L.B.Sm. – Colombia, Venezuela, Ecuador
Vriesea eltoniana E.Pereira & Ivo – Rio de Janeiro
Vriesea ensiformis (Vell.) Beer, including Vriesea warmingii  – from Bahia to Santa Catarina
Vriesea erythrodactylon (É.Morren) É.Morren ex Mez – from Espírito Santo to Santa Catarina
Vriesea exaltata Leme – Bahia
Vriesea fenestralis Linden & André – Espírito Santo, Rio de Janeiro
Vriesea fibrosa L.B.Sm. – Amazonas State in Venezuela
Vriesea fidelensis Leme – Rio de Janeiro
Vriesea flammea L.B.Sm. – eastern and southern Brazil
Vriesea flava And.Costa, H.Luther & Wand. – from São Paulo to Santa Catarina
Vriesea fluminensis E.Pereira – Rio de Janeiro
Vriesea fluviatilis Kessous & A.F.Costa
Vriesea fontanae Fraga & Leme – Espírito Santo
Vriesea fontourae B.R.Silva – Rio de Janeiro
Vriesea fosteriana L.B.Sm. – Espírito Santo
Vriesea fradensis And.Costa – Rio de Janeiro
Vriesea freicanecana J.A.Siqueira & Leme – Pernambuco
Vriesea friburgensis Mez – Brazil, Bolivia, Argentina, Paraguay
Vriesea garlippiana Leme – Rio de Janeiro
Vriesea gelatinosa R.L.Moura & A.F.Costa
Vriesea gigantea Gaudich. – from Bahia to Santa Catarina
Vriesea gladioflammans E.Pereira & Reitz – Rio de Janeiro
Vriesea gracilior (L.B.Sm.) Leme – Espírito Santo
Vriesea graciliscapa W.Weber – Bahia
Vriesea gradata (Baker) Mez – southeastern Brazil
Vriesea grandiflora Leme – Minas Gerais, Rio de Janeiro
Vriesea guttata Linden & André – southern Brazil
Vriesea harmsiana (L.B.Sm.) L.B.Sm. – Peru
Vriesea heterostachys (Baker) L.B.Sm. – southern Brazil
Vriesea hieroglyphica (Carrière) É.Morren – from Espírito Santo to Paraná
Vriesea hitchcockiana (L.B.Sm.) L.B.Sm. – Ecuador, Peru
Vriesea hodgei L.B.Sm. – Colombia
Vriesea hoehneana L.B.Sm. – southern Brazil
Vriesea hydrophora Ule – southern Brazil
Vriesea incurva (Griseb.) Read – Costa Rica, Panama, Cuba, Hispaniola, Jamaica, Colombia, Venezuela, Guyana, Ecuador, Bolivia 
Vriesea incurvata Gaudich. – southern Brazil
Vriesea inflata (Wawra) Wawra – from Espírito Santo to Santa Catarina
Vriesea interrogatoria L.B.Sm. – from Minas Gerais to São Paulo
Vriesea itatiaiae Wawra – southern Brazil
Vriesea johnstonii (Mez) L.B.Sm. & Pittendr. – Trinidad, Venezuela, Guyana
Vriesea jonesiana Leme – São Paulo
Vriesea jonghei (K.Koch) É.Morren – Trinidad & Tobago, French Guiana, Brazil
Vriesea joyae E.Pereira & I.A.Penna – Rio de Janeiro
Vriesea kautskyana E.Pereira & I.A.Penna – Espírito Santo, Rio de Janeiro
Vriesea koideae Rauh – Peru
Vriesea lancifolia (Baker) L.B.Sm. – Bahia
Vriesea languida L.B.Sm. – Espírito Santo
Vriesea laxa Mez – Venezuela
Vriesea leptantha Harms – Rio de Janeiro
Vriesea lidicensis Reitz – Rio de Janeiro
Vriesea lilliputiana Leme
Vriesea limae L.B.Sm. – Pernambuco
Vriesea limonensis Rauh – Ecuador
Vriesea linharesiae Leme & J.A.Siqueira – Bahia
Vriesea longicaulis (Baker) Mez – from Bahia to Santa Catarina
Vriesea longiscapa Ule – southern Brazil
Vriesea longisepala A.F.Costa – Bahia
Vriesea longistaminea C.C.Paula & Leme – Minas Gerais
Vriesea lubbersii (Baker) É.Morren ex Mez – from Espírito Santo to Santa Catarina
Vriesea lutheriana J.R.Grant – Costa Rica
Vriesea macrostachya (Bello) Mez – Cuba, Haiti, Puerto Rico, Trinidad; Carabobo State in Venezuela
Vriesea maculosa Mez – Bahia
Vriesea magna F.P.Uribbe & A.F.Costa
Vriesea maguirei L.B.Sm. – Venezuela, northern Brazil
Vriesea marceloi Versieux & T.Machado – Minas Gerais
Vriesea maxoniana (L.B.Sm.) L.B.Sm. – Bolivia and Salta Province of Argentina
Vriesea medusa Versieux
Vriesea melgueiroi I.Ramírez & Carnevali
Vriesea menescalii E.Pereira & Leme – Espírito Santo
Vriesea michaelii W.Weber – Brazil; probably extinct
Vriesea microrachis J.Gomes-da-Silva & A.F.Costa – Brazil
Vriesea mimosoensis D.R.Couto, Kessous & A.F.Costa
Vriesea minarum L.B.Sm. – Minas Gerais
Vriesea minor (L.B.Sm.) Leme – Minas Gerais
Vriesea minuta Leme – Bahia
Vriesea minutiflora Leme – Bahia
Vriesea mitoura L.B.Sm. – Amazonas State of Venezuela; Roraima
Vriesea modesta Mez – Espírito Santo, Rio de Janeiro
Vriesea mollis Leme – Rio de Janeiro
Vriesea monacorum L.B.Sm. – Minas Gerais
Vriesea morrenii Wawra (also spelt Vriesea morreni)
Vriesea × morreniana É.Morren
Vriesea mourae Kessous, B.Neves & A.F.Costa
Vriesea muelleri Mez – from São Paulo to Santa Catarina
Vriesea myriantha (Baker) Betancur (syn. Tillandsia myriantha)
Vriesea nanuzae Leme – Minas Gerais
Vriesea neoglutinosa Mez – from Bahia to Santa Catarina
Vriesea noblickii Martinelli & Leme – Bahia
Vriesea nubicola Leme – Rio de Janeiro
Vriesea oligantha (Baker) Mez – Bahia, Minas Gerais
Vriesea olmosana L.B.Sm. – Ecuador, Peru
Vriesea oxapampae Rauh – Pasco Province of Peru
Vriesea pabstii McWill. & L.B.Sm. – Espírito Santo, São Paulo
Vriesea paradoxa Mez – Bahia
Vriesea paraibica Wawra – Rio de Janeiro
Vriesea paratiensis E.Pereira – from Rio de Janeiro to Paraná
Vriesea pardalina Mez – southern Brazil
Vriesea parviflora L.B.Sm. – Espírito Santo
Vriesea parvula Rauh – São Paulo
Vriesea pastuchoffiana Glaz. ex Mez – Rio de Janeiro
Vriesea patula (Mez) L.B.Sm. – Ecuador, Peru 
Vriesea pauciflora Mez – Rio de Janeiro
Vriesea pauperrima E.Pereira – eastern + southern Brazil
Vriesea penduliflora L.B.Sm. – Minas Gerais, Rio de Janeiro
Vriesea penduliscapa Rauh – Moreno-Santiago region of Ecuador
Vriesea pereirae L.B.Sm. – Espírito Santo
Vriesea pereziana (André) L.B.Sm. – Colombia, Peru
Vriesea petraea (L.B.Sm.) L.B.Sm. – El Oro region of Ecuador
Vriesea philippocoburgi Wawra
Vriesea pinottii Reitz – southern Brazil
Vriesea piscatrix Versieux & Wand.
Vriesea platynema Gaudich. – Cuba, Jamaica, Trinidad, Venezuela, Guyana, Brazil, Misiones Provindce of Argentina 
Vriesea platzmannii É.Morren – southern Brazil
Vriesea pleiosticha (Griseb.) Gouda (synonym Mezobromelia pleiosticha) – Costa Rica, Panama, Trinidad, Venezuela, the Guianas, Peru, Ecuador, northern Brazil 
Vriesea poenulata (Baker) É.Morren ex Mez – Espírito Santo, Rio de Janeiro
Vriesea portentosa Leme
Vriesea procera (Mart. ex Schult. & Schult.f.) Wittm. – Trinidad, Venezuela, the Guianas, Peru, Ecuador, Brazil, Paraguay, Bolivia, Argentina 
Vriesea pseudoatra Leme – Rio de Janeiro
Vriesea pseudoligantha Philcox – Bahia
Vriesea psittacina (Hook.) Lindl. – Brazil, Paraguay
Vriesea pulchra Leme & L.Kollmann – Espírito Santo
Vriesea punctulata E.Pereira & I.A.Penna – Rio de Janeiro
Vriesea racinae L.B.Sm. – Espírito Santo, Minas Gerais
Vriesea rafaelii Leme – Minas Gerais
Vriesea rastrensis Leme – Santa Catarina in southern Brazil
Vriesea rectifolia Rauh – Pernambuco but probably extinct
Vriesea recurvata Gaudich. – Bahia
Vriesea regnellii Mez – Minas Gerais, Rio de Janeiro
Vriesea reitzii Leme & And.Costa – southern Brazil
Vriesea repandostachys Leme – Espírito Santo
Vriesea × retroflexa É.Morren
Vriesea revoluta B.R.Silva – Espírito Santo
Vriesea rhodostachys L.B.Sm. – Bahia, Espírito Santo
Vriesea roberto-seidelii W.Weber – Bahia
Vriesea robusta (Griseb.) L.B.Sm. – Colombia, Venezuela
Vriesea rodigasiana É.Morren – from Bahia to Santa Catarina
Vriesea roethii W.Weber – Rio de Janeiro
Vriesea rubens J.Gomes-da-Silva & A.F.Costa – Santa Catarina
Vriesea rubra (Ruiz & Pav.) Beer – Trinidad, Venezuela, Colombia, Peru, Brazil, Guyana 
Vriesea rubrobracteata Rauh – Colombia
Vriesea rubroviridis F.P.Uribbe & A.F.Costa
Vriesea rubyae E.Pereira – Rio de Janeiro
Vriesea ruschii L.B.Sm. – Minas Gerais, Bahia, Espírito Santo
Vriesea sagasteguii L.B.Sm. – Peru
Vriesea saltensis Leme & L.Kollmann
Vriesea sanctaparecidae Leme
Vriesea sanfranciscana Versieux & Wand. – Minas Gerais
Vriesea santaleopoldinensis Leme & L.Kollmann – Espírito Santo
Vriesea saundersii (Carrière) É.Morren (synonym Vriesea botafogensis) – Rio de Janeiro
Vriesea saxicola L.B.Sm. – Minas Gerais
Vriesea sazimae Leme – Minas Gerais, São Paulo
Vriesea scalaris É.Morren – Venezuela, Brazil
Vriesea sceptrum Mez – from Bahia to São Paulo
Vriesea schultesiana L.B.Sm. – Colombia
Vriesea schunkii Leme – Espírito Santo
Vriesea schwackeana Mez – from Bahia to São Paulo
Vriesea secundiflora Leme – Rio de Janeiro, São Paulo
Vriesea segadas-viannae L.B.Sm. – Minas Gerais
Vriesea seideliana W.Weber – Espírito Santo
Vriesea serrana E.Pereira & I.A.Penna – Rio de Janeiro
Vriesea serranegrensis Leme – Minas Gerais
Vriesea silvana Leme – Bahia
Vriesea simplex (Vell.) Beer – Trinidad, Venezuela, Colombia, Brazil 
Vriesea simulans Leme – Minas Gerais
Vriesea sincorana Mez – Bahia
Vriesea skotakii H.Luther & K.F.Norton – Panam
Vriesea socialis L.B.Sm. – Colombia, Venezuela
Vriesea sparsiflora L.B.Sm. – from Espírito Santo to São Paulo
Vriesea speckmaieri W.Till – Carabobo State of Venezuela
Vriesea stricta L.B.Sm. – Minas Gerais
Vriesea strobeliae Rauh – Ecuador
Vriesea sucrei L.B.Sm. & Read – Rio de Janeiro
Vriesea sulcata L.B.Sm. – Amazonas State of Venezuela
Vriesea swartzii (Baker) Mez – Jamaica
Vriesea takahashiana Leme & W.Till
Vriesea taritubensis E.Pereira & I.A.Penna – Rio de Janeiro to São Paulo
Vriesea tequendamae (André) L.B.Sm. – Venezuela, Colombia, Ecuador, Peru
Vriesea teresopolitana Leme – Rio de Janeiro
Vriesea thyrsoidea Mez – Rio de Janeiro
Vriesea tijucana E.Pereira – eastern Brazil
Vriesea tillandsioides L.B.Sm. – Peru
Vriesea triangularis Reitz – Santa Catarina
Vriesea triligulata Mez – Rio de Janeiro
Vriesea tubipetala Leme & R.L.Moura
Vriesea unilateralis (Baker) Mez – from Espírito Santo to Santa Catarina
Vriesea vagans (L.B.Sm.) L.B.Sm. – eastern + southern Brazil
Vriesea vellozicola Leme & J.A.Siqueira – Espírito Santo
Vriesea vexata Leme
Vriesea vexillata L.B.Sm. – Colombia
Vriesea vidalii L.B.Sm. & Handro – Rio de Janeiro
Vriesea vulpinoidea L.B.Sm. – from São Paulo to Santa Catarina
Vriesea wawrana Antoine (also spelt Vriesea wawranea; synonym Vriesea oleosa) – Bahia, Rio de Janeiro
Vriesea weberi E.Pereira & I.A.Penna – Espírito Santo
Vriesea wuelfinghoffii Rauh & E.Gross – Azuay Province in Ecuador
Vriesea wurdackii L.B.Sm. – Amazonas State of Venezuela
Vriesea zamorensis (L.B.Sm.) L.B.Sm. – Ecuador, Peru
Vriesea zildae R.L.Moura & A.F.Costa
Vriesea zonata Leme & J.A.Siqueira – Alagoas State in eastern Brazil

Former species
Species that have been placed in Vriesea but are not accepted by Plants of the World Online include:

Vriesea brassicoides (Baker) Mez = Stigmatodon brassicoides – Rio de Janeiro
Vriesea chontalensis (Baker) L.B.Sm. = Tillandsia chontalensis
Vriesea chrysostachys É.Morren = Goudaea chrysostachys – Trinidad, Colombia, Peru
Vriesea correia-araujoi E.Pereira & I.A.Penna – Rio de Janeiro, São Paulo
Vriesea costae B.R.Silva & Leme = Stigmatodon costae – Rio de Janeiro
Vriesea croceana Leme & G.K.Br. = Stigmatodon croceanus – Rio de Janeiro
Vriesea didistichoides (Mez) L.B.Sm. = Tillandsia didistichoides
Vriesea fontellana Leme & G.K.Br. = Stigmatodon fontellanus – Espírito Santo
Vriesea fragrans (André) L.B.Sm. = Tillandsia fragrans
Vriesea funebris L.B.Sm. = Stigmatodon funebris – Espírito Santo
Vriesea gastiniana Leme & G.K.Br. = Stigmatodon gastinianus – Rio de Janeiro
Vriesea glutinosa Lindl. = Lutheria glutinosa – Trinidad, Venezuela 
Vriesea goniorachis (Baker) Mez = Stigmatodon goniorachis – Rio de Janeiro
Vriesea harrylutheri Leme & G.K.Br. = Stigmatodon harrylutheri  – Espírito SantoVriesea heterandra (André) L.B.Sm. = Tillandsia heterandraVriesea malzinei É.Morren = Tillandsia malzinei – MexicoVriesea melgueroi I. Ramírez & Carnevali – Amazonas State of VenezuelaVriesea monstrum (Mez) L.B.Sm. = Jagrantia monstrum – Colombia, Ecuador, Panama, Costa Rica, Nicaragua  Vriesea ospinae H.Luther = Goudaea ospinae – ColombiaVriesea plurifolia Leme = Stigmatodon plurifolius – Espírito SantoVriesea splendens (Brongn.) Lem. = Lutheria splendens'' – Venezuela, the Guianas, Trinidad & Tobago

Photo gallery

References

External links

 BSI Genera Gallery Vriesea photos

 
Bromeliaceae genera
Epiphytes